Streptomyces aureus is a bacterium species from the genus of Streptomyces which has been isolated from soil from the United Kingdom. Streptomyces aureus produces azirinomycin and thiostrepton.

See also 
 List of Streptomyces species

References

Further reading

External links
Type strain of Streptomyces aureus at BacDive -  the Bacterial Diversity Metadatabase

aureus
Bacteria described in 2003